Upperchurch–Drombane GAA is a Gaelic Athletic Association club is located in the area of Upperchurch and Drombane, seven miles from Thurles in mid County Tipperary, Ireland. They compete in hurling at both Senior and Junior A levels and in gaelic football at Senior and Junior B grade. The local GAA pitch is located approximately 1 mile from Drombane village.

History
It is claimed that P. J. Riordan from Drombane scored all of Tipperary's 6-8 when they beat Kilkenny in the 1895 All Ireland final. If true this would make Riordan the highest ever scorer in an All Ireland final beating the current record of 5-4 by Mick "Gah" Ahern of Cork in the 1928 All-Ireland final.

Honours
In 1894 Drombane won the Tipperary Senior Hurling Championship. The team was captained by Fergus Moriarty.
1998: Tipperary Intermediate Hurling Championship winner
2000: Cahill Cup champions
2007: Tipperary Under 21 B county hurling champions
2007: Tipperary Minor B county football champions
2008: Mid Tipperary Under 21 B Football Champions
2008: Mid Tipperary Minor A Hurling Champions
2008: Mid Tipperary Intermediate Football Champions
2010: Cahill Cup Champions
2013: Mid & County Minor B Football Champions
2015: Mid & County U21 B football champions

List of titles
 Tipperary Senior Hurling Championship (1) 1894 (as Drombane)
 Tipperary Intermediate Football Championship (1)  2015
 Mid Tipperary Intermediate Football Championship (6) 1977, 2007, 2008, 2013, 2014, 2015
 Tipperary Intermediate Hurling Championship (1) 1998
 Mid Tipperary Intermediate Hurling Championship (3) 1991, 1993, 1998
 Tipperary Junior A Football Championship (1) 2002
 Mid Tipperary Junior A Football Championship (4) 1990, 1991, 2001, 2002
 Mid Tipperary Junior B Football Championship (2) 2006, 2008
 Mid Tipperary Junior A Hurling Championship (6) 1933, 1950, 1966, 1976, 1977, 1996
 Tipperary Junior B Hurling Championship (1) 2016
 Mid Tipperary Junior B Hurling Championship (2) 1994, 2016
 Mid Tipperary Under-21 A Football Championship: (1) 2022
 Tipperary Under-21 B Football Championship (1) 2015
 Mid Tipperary Under-21 B Football Championship (9) 1989, 1995, 2000, 2001, 2006, 2008, 2013, 2014, 2015
 Tipperary Under-21 B Hurling Championship (2) 2007, 2012
 Mid Tipperary Under-21 B Hurling Championship (7) 1989, 1992, 1995, 2005, 2007, 2012, 2015
 Tipperary Minor B Football Championship (2) 2007, 2013
 Mid Tipperary Minor B Football Championship (4) 2007, 2013, 2014, 2016
 Mid Tipperary Minor A Hurling Championship (1) 2008
 Mid Tipperary Minor B Hurling Championship (1) 2006
 Mid Tipperary Minor C Hurling Championship (1) 1996

Notable players
 James Barry
 Jody Brennan
 Ned Lambe
 P. J. Riordan
 Mikey Lee (Wicklow)
 Michael Ryan went onto manage Tipperary
 Paul Shanahan

References

External links
Official Upperchurch–Drombane GAA Club website
Tipperary GAA site

Gaelic games clubs in County Tipperary
Hurling clubs in County Tipperary
Gaelic football clubs in County Tipperary